D12 World is the second and final studio album by American hip-hop supergroup D12, released on April 27, 2004. The album sold 544,000 copies in its first week on the U.S. Billboard 200. The album is also the last D12 release to feature Proof before his death in 2006, and the second D12 album to feature Bugz on a track.

Background
In memory of Bugz, who was killed prior to a concert on May 21, 1999, the group recorded the track "Good Die Young" in memory of him. The album also includes a skit entitled "Bugz '97", which is a 1997 recording of Bugz, originally taken from the song "Desperados". The group was often overshadowed by Eminem's massive success, and as such, the group toured without him for promotion of the album (but the album still reached the top of the US Billboard chart). At the time, Eminem was busy recording Encore. Although shadowed by Eminem's success, members Bizarre and Proof managed to prevail with mildly successful solo careers following D12 World, with the releases of Hannicap Circus and Searching for Jerry Garcia, respectively, in 2005. Before the album's release, "6 in the Morning" was featured on Eminem's 2003 mixtape Straight from the Lab and was entitled "Come On In".

Singles
The album produced two singles, My Band and How Come, which were released on March 14, 2004 and June 8, 2004, respectively.

Production
The album was executively produced by Eminem, who also handled most of the audio production for the album along with Denaun Porter, Dr. Dre, Essman, Hi-Tek, Kanye West, Luis Resto, Mike Elizondo, Night & Day, Red Spyda, Trackboyz and Witt & Pep. Guest appearances on the album included Obie Trice, Dina Rae, Young Zee and B-Real.

Commercial performance
D12 World debuted at the top of the US, UK, Irish, Canadian, Australian and NZ albums charts. It debuted at number 2 in Germany and also in the top 5 in Switzerland and Norway. It debuted in the top 10 in Sweden, Denmark, France, Belgium and the Netherlands.

It sold about 544,000 records in its first week of release in the United States alone. Debuting at number one on the Billboard 200, the album ended the first five-week run of singer Usher's best-selling album, Confessions. On the week of May 22, 2004, Usher's Confessions regained the Billboard 200's number-one spot, sending D12 World to number two. The album went on to have the best performing first-week sales for a hip hop release of that year until the release of Eminem's Encore that November. Ultimately the album was certified double platinum, having a twenty-eight week stay on the chart overall.

The album debuted at number one on the UK Albums Chart with approximately 76,666 copies sold during the first week of release. Ultimately the album was certified platinum; total sales of the album stand at 323,649 as of December 2017.

"My Band", the first single, was also successful, reaching number one in Australia and on the US Rhythmic Top 40, the Top 5 in the UK and Germany, and Top 10 on the Billboard Hot 100.

Critical reception
Upon release, D12 World received mixed reviews from critics. At Metacritic, which assigns a normalized rating out of 100 to reviews from mainstream critics, the album received an average score of 58, based on 13 reviews, indicating "mixed or average reviews".

Track listing

Notes
 signifies an additional producer.
 signifies a co-producer.
The skit "Bugz" is taken from the song "Desperados", performed by DJ Butter, Eminem, Proof, Bugz & the Almighty Dreadnaughtz.
The song "Just Like U" does not appear on the clean version of the album.
The song "Get My Gun" is an unlockable song in the 2006 open-world game Scarface: The World Is Yours.
The song "Barbershop" can be found on the Barbershop 2: Back in Business soundtrack.
The clean version of the album allows "ass" to be uncensored but few uses of the word "hell", some references to alcohol use, most references to drugs, sexual content, and violence are edited out, although all sound effects remain intact.
The song "6 In The Morning (Come On In)" was leaked in the bootleg mixtape Straight From The Lab

Sample credits
The song "Git Up" contains a sample from "The Name Game" by Shirley Ellis
The song "Just Like U" contains a sample from "Sir Galahad" by Rick Wakeman.
The song "U R the One" contains a sample from "Girl Callin'" by Chocolate Milk
The song "Good Die Young" contains a sample from "Screen Kiss" by Thomas Dolby
The song "Keep Talkin'" contains samples from "Tortuga" by Starwood and "Halftime" by Nas

Personnel
 B-Real – Guest Appearance
 Steve Baughman – Mixing
 Rondell Beene – Skit
 Bizarre – Skit
 Joe Borges – Assistant
 Bugz – Skit
 Tony Campana – Engineer
 Richard Castro – Skit
 Larry Chatman – Project Coordinator
 Mike "Chav" Chavarria – Engineer
 D12 – Group
 Dr. Dre – Producer, Mixing
 Mike Elizondo – Keyboards
 Eminem – Producer, Executive Producer, Mixing, Skit
 Essman – Producer
 50 Cent – Skit
 Brian "Big Bass" Gardener – Mastering
 Marcus Heisser – A&R
 Richard Hunt – Engineer
 Steven King – Bass, Guitar, Engineer, Mixing, Skit
 Kuniva – Skit
 Marc Labelle – A&R
 Tracy McNew – A&R
 Riggs Morales – A&R
 Night and Day – Producer
 Red Spyda – Keyboards, Producer
 Luis Resto – Keyboards, Producer
 Michael Strange – Engineer
 Obie Trice – Guest Appearance
 Sacha Waldman – Photography
 Young Zee – Skit
 Kanye West – Producer
 Paul Williams - Songwriter
 J.R. Rotem - Keyboards, Songwriter

Charts

Weekly charts

Year-end charts

Certifications

References

External links
 AllMusic review
 

2004 albums
D12 albums
Shady Records albums
Albums produced by Dr. Dre
Albums produced by Kanye West
Albums produced by Hi-Tek
Albums produced by Mr. Porter
Albums produced by Eminem
Albums produced by Mike Elizondo
Horrorcore albums